Biberach is a Landkreis (district) in Baden-Württemberg, Germany. It is bounded by (from the south and clockwise) the districts of Ravensburg, Sigmaringen, Reutlingen and Alb-Donau, and the Bavarian districts Neu-Ulm, Unterallgäu and the district-free city Memmingen. The major towns in the district of Biberach are Biberach an der Riß, Riedlingen, Ochsenhausen and Laupheim.

Geography 

The district consists of hilly countryside between the rivers of the Danube and the Iller. The Danube crosses the district in its westernmost part from south to north. The Iller forms the eastern border of the district. Another river is the Riss (Riß), an affluent of the Danube crossing the district from south to north.

The Federsee is a small lake in the southwest of the district. Its area is only 1.4 km², but it is famous for Neolithic findings and rare birds.

Media 
The local newspaper is the Schwäbische Zeitung ("Swabian Newspaper"). Biberach has also a film festival for German films which celebrated its 31st anniversary in 2009.

Coat of arms 
The imperial eagle symbolizes the imperial city of Biberach. Originally the coat of arms of the city showed an eagle as well as a beaver as a canting symbol. In 1488 the coat of arms of the city was changed to show only the beaver. The crosier symbolises the monasteries of the region.

Cities and towns

References

External links 

 Official website of the district of Biberach (German)
 Federsee Neolithic Museum (German, English)
 Federsee Nature Reserve (German)

 
Tübingen (region)
Districts of Baden-Württemberg